He Yecong (born 15 February 1994) is a Chinese tennis player.

He has a career high ATP singles ranking of 492 achieved on 27 June 2016. He also has a career high ATP doubles ranking of 498 achieved on 21 August 2017.

He made his ATP main draw debut at the 2016 Chengdu Open, in the doubles draw partnering Sun Fajing.

He has won 1 singles title and has won 2 doubles tiles on the ITF Futures Tour.

ATP Challenger and ITF Futures finals

Singles: 5 (1–4)

Doubles: 5 (2–3)

External links

1994 births
Living people
Chinese male tennis players
Sportspeople from Hangzhou
Tennis players from Zhejiang
21st-century Chinese people